Blackpink: The Movie (stylized in all caps or as BLɅϽKPIИK THE MOVIE) is a 2021 South Korean documentary film directed by Oh Yoon-dong and Jung Su-yee, featuring South Korean girl group Blackpink. It was released on August 4, 2021, in South Korea and worldwide.

Synopsis
The film features interviews with the four members of Blackpink — Jisoo, Jennie, Rosé and Lisa and live performances from The Show and In Your Area World Tour. It includes segments: "The Room of Memories," which highlights their last five years since debut, "Beauty" includes shots of each member and "Exclusive Interviews" features messages for their fans.

Cast
 Kim Ji-soo
 Jennie Kim
 Roseanne Park
 Lalisa Manoban

Production
South Korean girl group Blackpink debuted on August 8, 2016, with the single album Square One and went onto become one of the most successful K-pop acts. On June 16, 2021, YG Entertainment announced the release of Blackpink: The Movie as the part of their fifth debut anniversary project, dubbed "4 + 1 Project".

On June 23, the film was announced for the release on August 4, in South Korea. The tickets went on sale on June 30.

Release
For its debut on August 4, the film was released in more than 100 countries and 3,000 theaters worldwide. The release was delayed to the end of August in countries in Southeast Asia such as Indonesia, Thailand and Malaysia due to COVID-19 pandemic regulations. The number of theaters worldwide will expand from 3,000 to 4,200 upon release in Southeast Asia.

Reception

Box office
The film garnered almost 500,000 global viewers in five days. The countries with the greatest number of moviegoers were Mexico, the United States, Turkey, Brazil and Japan.

In South Korea, the film sold 5,420 tickets and grossed $62,483 from August 6 to 8 to place ninth at the weekend box office. Overall, from August 4 to 9 the film recorded 11,761 in total admissions and $134,412 in earnings.

References

External links
 
 
 

Blackpink
2021 films
2021 documentary films
Documentary films about girl groups
Concert films
South Korean documentary films
2020s Korean-language films
Thai-language films
Documentary films about K-pop
2020s English-language films